Barclay House, also known as the Bedford Mansion or Barclay Mansion, is a historic home located at Bedford in Bedford County, Pennsylvania. It was built in 1889, and is a -story, brick dwelling with Gothic and Italianate style details.  It has a jerkin-head gable roof.  It once housed the Bedford County Public Library.  It is the current location of the Bedford Fine Art Gallery which features 19th century art.

It was listed on the National Register of Historic Places in 1978.

References

External links 
Bedford Fine Art Gallery

Gothic Revival architecture in Pennsylvania
Houses on the National Register of Historic Places in Pennsylvania
Houses completed in 1889
Houses in Bedford County, Pennsylvania
Italianate architecture in Pennsylvania
National Register of Historic Places in Bedford County, Pennsylvania